"The Ending Is Just the Beginning Repeating" is a song by Australian rock band The Living End. It is the lead single and title track from their sixth studio album. The song was released through iTunes Store on 3 June 2011.

Track listing 
All tracks written by Chris Cheney.

"The Ending Is Just the Beginning Repeating" – 4:08

References

2011 songs
The Living End songs
Songs written by Chris Cheney
2011 singles
Dew Process singles